Gujjhar River or Gujjar Stream, is among the main streams of Karachi besides Orangi Stream. The Gujjhar River is a small ephemeral stream that flows through the Pakistani megacity of Karachi from north east (North Karachi Sector 11J) to the center and merges with Lyari River (in Liaqatabad Area) before draining into the Arabian Sea.

In May 2021, Awami Workers Party of Pakistan organised a demonstration by the victims of illegal evictions in the Gujjar Nala and Orangi Nala areas of Karachi. A leader of the Gujjar Nala affected people, Abid Asghar reportedly said, "We have spent our childhood and youth in these houses. For you, these buildings are stone and mortar, but for us they are our life. Our only demand is that this operation be halted until we are given alternative housing in the same district, as per the order of the Supreme Court."

References 

Rivers of Karachi